Coss is a surname. Notable people with the surname include:

Andrea Coss (born 1960), Australian rower
David Coss, American politician and civil servant
Gabriel Coss, music video director
Peter Coss (born 1946), British historian
Roxy Coss, American saxophonist and composer